The 1886 Spanish general election was held on Sunday, 4 April (for the Congress of Deputies) and on Sunday, 25 April 1886 (for the Senate), to elect the 4th Cortes of the Kingdom of Spain in the Restoration period. All 434 seats in the Congress of Deputies were up for election, as well as 180 of 360 seats in the Senate. The electorate comprised about 4.6% of the country's population.

The election resulted in a large majority for the government-supported candidates of the Liberal Party, which was possible through Antonio Cánovas del Castillo's peaceful handover of power to Práxedes Mateo Sagasta, in what came to be known as the Pact of El Pardo. Running against the pact were the Francisco Romero Robledo and José López Domínguez-led factions within the Conservative and Liberal parties, respectively, but which failed to achieve decisive breakthroughs. The resulting legislature would come to be known as the "Long Parliament": lasting from 1886 to 1891, it would be the only one during the Restoration period to last its full five year-term.

Overview

Electoral system
The Spanish Cortes were envisaged as "co-legislative bodies", based on a nearly perfect bicameral system. Both the Congress of Deputies and the Senate had legislative, control and budgetary functions, sharing equal powers except for laws on contributions or public credit, where the Congress had preeminence. Voting for the Cortes was on the basis of censitary suffrage, which comprised national males over 25 years of age fulfilling one of the following criteria: being taxpayers with a minimum quota of 25 Pt per territorial contribution (paid at least one year in advance) or 50 Pt per industrial subsidy (paid at least two years in advance), having a particular position (royal academy numerary members; ecclesiastic individuals; active, unemployed or retired public employees; military personnel; widely recognized painters and sculptors; public teachers; etc.), or having at least a two-year residency in a municipality, provided that an educational or professional capacity could be proven. In Cuba and Puerto Rico, the taxpayer quota requirement ascended to 125 Pt for both the territorial contribution and the industrial or trade subsidy.

For the Congress of Deputies, 111 seats were elected using a partial block voting system in 31 multi-member constituencies, with the remaining 322 being elected under a one-round first-past-the-post system in single-member districts. Candidates winning a plurality in each constituency were elected. In constituencies electing eight seats, electors could vote for up to six candidates; in those with seven seats, for up to five candidates; in those with six seats, for up to four; in those with four or five seats, for up to three candidates; and for one candidate in single-member districts. Additionally, up to ten deputies could be elected through cumulative voting in several single-member constituencies, provided that they obtained more than 10,000 votes overall. The Congress was entitled to one member per each 50,000 inhabitants, with each multi-member constituency being allocated a fixed number of seats. The law also provided for by-elections to fill seats vacated throughout the legislature.

As a result of the aforementioned allocation, each Congress multi-member constituency was entitled the following seats:

For the Senate, 180 seats were indirectly elected by the local councils and major taxpayers, with electors voting for delegates instead of senators. Elected delegates—equivalent in number to one-sixth of the councillors in each local council—would then vote for senators using a write-in, two-round majority voting system. The provinces of Álava, Albacete, Ávila, Biscay, Cuenca, Guadalajara, Guipúzcoa, Huelva, Logroño, Matanzas, Palencia, Pinar del Río, Puerto Príncipe, Santa Clara, Santander, Santiago de Cuba, Segovia, Soria, Teruel, Valladolid and Zamora were allocated two seats each, whereas each of the remaining provinces was allocated three seats, for a total of 147. The remaining 33 were allocated to special districts comprising a number of institutions, electing one seat each—the archdioceses of Burgos, Granada, Santiago de Compostela, Santiago de Cuba, Seville, Tarragona, Toledo, Valencia, Valladolid and Zaragoza; the Royal Spanish Academy; the royal academies of History, Fine Arts of San Fernando, Exact and Natural Sciences, Moral and Political Sciences and Medicine; the universities of Madrid, Barcelona, Granada, Havana, Oviedo, Salamanca, Santiago, Seville, Valencia, Valladolid and Zaragoza; and the economic societies of Friends of the Country from Madrid, Barcelona, Havana–Puerto Rico, León, Seville and Valencia. An additional 180 seats comprised senators in their own right—the Monarch's offspring and the heir apparent once coming of age; Grandees of Spain of the first class; Captain Generals of the Army and the Navy Admiral; the Patriarch of the Indies and archbishops; and the presidents of the Council of State, the Supreme Court, the Court of Auditors, the Supreme War Council and the Supreme Council of the Navy, after two years of service—as well as senators for life (who were appointed by the Monarch).

Election date
The term of each chamber of the Cortes—the Congress and one-half of the elective part of the Senate—expired five years from the date of their previous election, unless they were dissolved earlier. The previous Congress and Senate elections were held on 27 April and 8 May 1884, which meant that the legislature's terms would have expired on 27 April and 8 May 1889, respectively. The monarch had the prerogative to dissolve both chambers at any given time—either jointly or separately—and call a snap election. There was no constitutional requirement for simultaneous elections for the Congress and the Senate, nor for the elective part of the Senate to be renewed in its entirety except in the case that a full dissolution was agreed by the monarch. Still, there was only one case of a separate election (for the Senate in 1877) and no half-Senate elections taking place under the 1876 Constitution.

The Cortes were officially dissolved on 8 March 1886, with the dissolution decree setting the election dates for 4 April (for the Congress) and 25 April 1886 (for the Senate) and scheduling for both chambers to convene on 10 May.

Background

The death of King Alfonso XII in November 1885 at the age of 27, with no heir apparent and with her spouse—Maria Christina of Austria—poised to become queen regent under the provisions of the Constitution, had seen a prospective political crisis being averted by the secret signing of the Pact of El Pardo between Antonio Cánovas del Castillo, incumbent prime minister and leader of the Conservative Party, and Práxedes Mateo Sagasta, leader of the Liberal Party. Both political parties had dominated Spanish politics during the early Restoration period, and through the pact aimed to temporarily thwart the political fighting between the two main monarchist parties and provide stability to the regime by establishing the turno system of alternance. Francisco Romero Robledo, who vied for power with Francisco Silvela within the Conservative party, split off in protest to Cánovas' "voluntary relinquishment" of government.

Results

Congress of Deputies

Senate

Distribution by group

References

Bibliography

1886 elections in Spain
1886 in Spain
1886
April 1886 events